Bout Soul is an album by American saxophonist Jackie McLean recorded in 1967 and released on the Blue Note label. It features McLean in a quintet with trumpeter Woody Shaw, pianist LaMont Johnson, bassist Scotty Holt and drummer Rashied Ali. Trombonist Grachan Moncur III guests on three tracks, and Barbara Simmons recites the words on “Soul”.

Reception
The AllMusic review by Stephen Thomas Erlewine stated:

Track listing
"Soul" (Grachan Moncur III, Barbara Simmons) - 10:17
"Conversion Point" (Jackie McLean) - 9:47
"Big Ben's Voice" (LaMont Johnson) - 10:08
"Dear Nick, Dear John" (Scotty Holt) - 4:56
"Erdu" (Johnson) - 5:57
"Big Ben's Voice" [Alternate take] - 9:55 Bonus track on CD reissue

Personnel
Jackie McLean – alto saxophone
Woody Shaw – trumpet (tracks 1–3, 5 & 6)
Grachan Moncur III – trombone (tracks 1, 2 & 5)
LaMont Johnson – piano
Scotty Holt – bass
Rashied Ali – drums
Barbara Simmons – recitation (track 1)

References

1969 albums
Blue Note Records albums
Jackie McLean albums
Albums recorded at Van Gelder Studio
Albums produced by Francis Wolff